IK Göta is a Swedish sports club, which was very successful in several sports such as track and field, handball, bowling, field hockey, ice hockey, soccer (women only) and bandy during the 20th century. Their most famous and successful sport was ice hockey. They won the Swedish ice hockey championship nine times, including the inaugural championship in 1922. The club was also operating bandy teams, both women's and men's, winning the Swedish men's championship in bandy once, in 1927. In women's bandy they were far more successful, winning eight times, the last time in 1984.

Today, the club only operates an ice hockey section under the name Göta Traneberg IK, following a merger with Tranebergs IF in 2007. The section operates both kids, junior and senior ice hockey teams. The club's representation team plays season 2019–20 in Hockeytvåan, the fourth tier of ice hockey in Sweden.

History
IK Göta was founded October 1, 1900, and was one of the pioneers in Swedish ice hockey. The team took the initiative to form the Swedish Ice Hockey Association in 1922 and won the first Swedish Championship against Hammarby IF with a score of 6-0 the same year. In total, they won nine Swedish Championships, the last one in 1948.

The team played in the highest league, now the Swedish Hockey League, in Sweden for 34 seasons and won nine championships, last time in 1948. The ice hockey section merged with Tranebergs IF in 2007, forming junior and senior teams under the name Göta Traneberg IK.

The club was founded by Gothenburg guest workers, in a part of Stockholm nicknamed Sibirien (between Östermalm and Vasastan), who moved to Stockholm to escape unemployment. Therefore, the name "IK Göta". The team's logotype is a winged foot. The colors of the club's Track & Field team was grey and black, nicknamed The Steel Grey ("de stålgrå"). The first site the team competed/played at was the Olympic Stadium in Stockholm. A few years later the team's site were moved to nearby Östermalms IP. The Ice Hockey team relocated in the mid 1970s, due to less youths in central Stockholm, to the Bromma area, a Stockholm suburb within the city limits. The idea was to be able to grow the team with more junior teams.  The sporting grounds in Bromma is named "Stora Mossen" after the old classic sporting ground in Gothenburg City with the same name.

Bandy
In the first year of bandy league system in Sweden, 1930–31, IK Göta entered in Division 1 Södra together with
Djurgårdens IF, IF Göta, IFK Strängnäs, IFK Uppsala, Linköpings AIK, Nässjö IF, and Örebro SK and finished 2nd.

Honours

Domestic
 Swedish Champions:
 Winners (1): 1927

References

External links
 IK Göta homepage

 
 
 
 
 

 
Ice hockey teams in Sweden
Sporting clubs in Stockholm
Bandy clubs established in 1900
Defunct bandy clubs in Sweden
Swedish handball clubs
1900 establishments in Sweden
Ice hockey teams in Stockholm County
Multi-sport clubs in Sweden